Admir Terzić (born 19 September 1992) is a Bosnian footballer who plays for TuS Erndtebrück.

External links
 
 Admir Terzić at Fupa

1992 births
Living people
People from Aachen (district)
Sportspeople from Cologne (region)
Footballers from North Rhine-Westphalia
German people of Bosnia and Herzegovina descent
Association football defenders
German footballers
Bosnia and Herzegovina footballers
Borussia Dortmund II players
SV Lippstadt 08 players
TuRU Düsseldorf players
TuS Erndtebrück players
FC Wegberg-Beeck players
Regionalliga players
3. Liga players
Landesliga players
Oberliga (football) players